Guangzhou Football Club, formerly known as Guangzhou Evergrande Taobao Football Club, is a Chinese professional football club based in Guangzhou, Guangdong that competes in China League One, the second tier of Chinese football. They play their home games at the Tianhe Stadium with a seating capacity of 54,856. The club's majority shareholders are the Evergrande Real Estate Group (56.71%) and the e-commerce company Alibaba Group (37.81%), while the rest of the shares are traded in the Chinese OTC system.

The club was founded in 1954, and won several second tier titles before turning professional in 1993. Their results improved, leading to a runners-up spot in China's top tier. Unable to improve upon these results, the club went through a period of stagnation and decline before they experienced a brief revival, when they won the 2007 second division. In 2009, the club was embroiled in a match-fixing scandal and was subsequently relegated. In 2010, the Evergrande Real Estate Group decided to purchase the club and pumped significant funds into the team. They immediately won promotion and gained their first top tier title in the 2011 season. The club is the only Chinese football club to win the AFC Champions League twice, in 2013 and 2015. The club is also the first Chinese club to participate in the FIFA Club World Cup, making its first appearance in 2013. Between 2011 and 2017, Guangzhou won seven consecutive Chinese Super League titles, before being relegated in 2022 due to financial problems.

According to Forbes report from 2016, the team was valued at US$282 million, the most out of all Chinese football teams, with a reported operating loss of over US$200 million in 2015.

History

Early history
In June 1954, the local Guangzhou sports body founded Guangzhou Football Team to take part in the newly formed Chinese national football league. They entered the club in the 1955 league season and named Luo Dizhi as their first manager. He guided them to an eighth spot finish in their debut campaign. The league had grown to incorporate a second tier and their debut season performance final standing relegated them to the second division. Guangzhou won the division championship, however the Chinese Football Association decided to restructure the league at the beginning of the 1957 season and Guangzhou were denied promotion. Despite this, Luo Rongman managed the team to win the 1958 second division title; however, the club were unable to gain promotion because this time they went into receivership. They were not re-established until April 1961 and were allowed to take part in the top tier. Back within the top division Guangzhou often struggled within the league and were again relegated to the second tier at the end of the 1963 league season. They remained there until 1966 when the Cultural Revolution halted football in China.

Back-to-back promotions and sponsorship deal
When the Chinese football league restarted, Guangzhou took the unusual step of abstaining from the competition and instead on 26 October 1977 brought Luo Rongman to manage their youth team. The team played within the National Youth League until 1980 when it was decided that they were mature enough to play in the senior football league pyramid. They started in the recently established third division. The club's youth team development immediately paid off and players such as Mai Chao, Zhao Dayu and later Wu Qunli all rapidly rose into Chinese international footballers. Guangzhou gained successive promotions until they reached the top tier. At the end of the 1982 league season Guangzhou were relegated again. They returned to the top division at the end of the 1984 season via the Chinese FA Cup. Guangzhou also became the first Chinese team to gain sponsorship when the Guangzhou Baiyunshan Pharmaceutical Factory signed a $200,000 annual deal with the club.

Becoming fully professional and match-fixing scandal
Throughout the 1990s, the Chinese Football Association were demanding more professionalism from their football teams. Guangzhou was one of the first fully professional football clubs in China after the Apollo Group took over the club on 8 January 1993. The investment aided the manager Zhou Sui'an to help create a competitive squad. Hu Zhijun won the top goalscoring award. Guangzhou were able to gain a runners-up spot in the 1994 league season. The following season Zhou Sui'an left the team after having twice guided the club to a runners-up position within the league and a runners-up spot against Shanghai in the 1991 Chinese FA Cup. After his exit, the club were unable to replicate the same results. When influential international footballers Peng Weiguo and Hu Zhijun left the club, the team went into free fall and were relegated at the end of the 1998 league season. With the management concerned about the team's performance, an investigation was launched which discovered that Wen Junwu and three other players were in collusion with gambling groups and were immediately expelled from the club. In 2001, the Guangzhou Sports Bureau took over the club again. With significant investment coming from the Zhejiang Geely Holding Group Co., Ltd it was hoped that the club could push for promotion. The division was rocked by a match-fixing scandal involving Changchun Yatai, Chengdu Wuniu, Jiangsu Sainty and Zhejing Greentown. Guangzhou's new sponsors Geely immediately pulled their funding from the team to distance themselves from the bad publicity. The club went through a tough transitional period until the Sunray Cave Group took over the club in 2004 and started to invest money in hopes of pushing for promotion. When the Guangzhou Pharmaceuticals group took over the club in 2006, they were able to realize the ambition of gaining promotion. The club won the 2007 second division title and entry to the Chinese Super League.
In February 2010, Guangzhou was relegated back to the China League One in the fallout of a match-fixing scandal despite having achieved a ninth-place finish in the 2009 season. The match in question was the 19 August 2006 league game against Shanxi Wosen Luhu, which Guangzhou won 5–1 when they were still playing in the China League One. It was discovered by the police that the Guangzhou general manager Yang Xu paid ¥200,000 to the opposing general manager Wang Po to secure a win at home and that Guangzhou's vice presidents Wu Xiaodong and Xie Bin knew about it. With the offending participants sentenced to jail for fraud, the club was put up for sale. On 28 February 2010, Evergrande Real Estate Group took over the club for a fee of ¥100 million. Xu Jiayin, chairman of Evergrande Real Estate Group, said that they would pump more funds into the transfer market. His first act was to sign in Chinese national team striker Gao Lin from Shanghai Shenhua for a reported fee of ¥6 million. Then, he replaced the head coach Peng Weiguo with former Beijing Guoan manager Lee Jang-soo with no indication. In the 2010 summer transfer window, the club signed Sun Xiang, the first Chinese footballer to play in the UEFA Champions League with PSV Eindhoven, and the Chinese national team captain Zheng Zhi on 28 June 2010. On 30 June 2010, Guangzhou confirmed that they had signed Muriqui on a four-year deal from Campeonato Brasileiro Série A side Atlético Mineiro with a domestic record fee of ¥23 million. On 30 October 2010, Guangzhou became League One champions for the second time and returned to the Super League after a 3–1 win against Hunan Billows.

Domestic domination and international success
During the 2011 season, Guangzhou Evergrande further strengthened its squad with the purchase of Argentinean Dario Conca and Brazilian Cléo. Although the team was promoted to the Super League in the first year, they clinched the league title in late September 2011 although there were four games yet to play. In March 2012, Guangzhou played and won their first-ever AFC Champions League match, defeating South Korean champions Jeonbuk Hyundai Motors 5–1. In addition, Paraguayan Lucas Barrios left the German champions Borussia Dortmund in summer 2012 to join Guangzhou Evergrande. Marcello Lippi replaced Lee Jang-soo as the head coach and brought in South Korean defender Kim Young-gwon and Chinese midfielder Huang Bowen. Guangzhou was knocked out of the 2012 AFC Champions League when they lost 5–4 on aggregate to Al-Ittihad in the quarter-finals. They became the first Chinese side to reach the quarter-finals since 2006. During the 2012 season, Guangzhou won the league for the second time in a row, becoming the first team in China to win the Super League title twice in a row, while also securing the Chinese FA Cup to become double winners for 2012.

In the 2013 season, Guangzhou Evergrande strengthened their squad by signing Chinese goalkeeper Zeng Cheng and Brazilian Elkeson. This proved to be beneficial to Guangzhou as they became the first team in China to win the Super League three times in a row. The club also won the 2013 AFC Champions League by defeating FC Seoul in the final on the away goals rule, after drawing 2–2 in the first leg in Seoul and 1–1 in the second leg in Guangzhou, becoming the first Chinese side to win the tournament since 1990. By winning the AFC Champions League, Guangzhou was assured a place in the 2013 FIFA Club World Cup, entering in the quarter-finals, beating the African champions Al-Ahly 2–0. In the semi-finals, they were defeated by the European champions Bayern Munich 3–0. In the third place match, the club lost against the South American champions Atlético Mineiro 3–2 and finished in fourth place. Guangzhou won its fourth and fifth consecutive Chinese Super League titles in 2014 and 2015, respectively. On 21 November 2015, the club won its second continental championship, defeating Al-Ahli 1–0 on aggregate in the 2015 AFC Champions League Final. In the 2015 FIFA Club World Cup, Guangzhou won 2–1 against Club América in the quarter-finals before losing 3–0 against Barcelona in the semi-finals. Guangzhou also lost the third place match 2–1 against Hiroshima Sanfrecce, ending up in the same position as in the 2013 edition. By 2020, Guangzhou Evergrande won a total of eight Super League championships, including seven consecutive titles from 2011 to 2017.

Financial troubles and relegation
Ahead of the 2021 season, the team was renamed Guangzhou FC due to the Chinese Football Association's request for "neutral" names that would omit references to the investors and companies that own the club. In the same year, the Chinese financial crisis and the problems of the Evergrande Group caused the financial collapse of the club. After losing several key players, the team was relegated from the Super League in 2022, ending their twelve-season stay in the top flight.

Stadium 
Guangzhou play their home games at Tianhe Stadium with a capacity for 54,856 spectators. In April 2020, construction work began on the new 100,000-capacity Guangzhou Evergrande Football Stadium. Completion was scheduled for December 2022, in time to host the opening ceremony of the 2023 AFC Asian Cup. However, due to the Chinese property sector crisis, sparked by the Evergrande Group, the project was cancelled in mid-2022.

Ownership and naming history

Sponsorship

Rivalries

When professionalism was established within the Chinese football leagues in 1994, it allowed more than one team to play within each region. This saw the establishment of Guangzhou Matsunichi which used to be the youth academy of Guangzhou FC before being sold to Matsunichi Digital Holdings Limited. Direct ties between these two teams also saw them share the Yuexiushan Stadium. In their first meeting in the first round of the 1995 Chinese FA Cup, Matsunichi beat Guangzhou FC 4–3 on aggregate. For a brief period during the 1998 season, both teams were in the top tier with Matsunichi finishing higher than Guangzhou FC; however, the rivalry would reach its peak and subsequent conclusion during the 2000 season with both clubs in the second tier fighting relegation. On 15 July 2000, Guangzhou FC won 3–1 against Matsunichi which inevitability helped lead to Matsunichi's relegation, causing Matsunichi to disband at the end of the season.      	

When Guangzhou R&F moved to the city of Guangzhou, a local derby, often referred to as the Canton derby, was born. The first Canton derby was at Yuexiushan Stadium on 16 March 2012 as Guangzhou Evergrande lost 2–0 against Guangzhou R&F. Relations between the two club owners remain cordial off the pitch and club owners Xu Jiayin and Zhang Li were seen enjoying a meal together instead of watching the second derby in 2012, which Guangzhou R&F also won.

Current squad

First team squad

Coaching staff

Source:

Managerial history

Amateur period (1954–1993)

Professional period (1994–present)

Honours
All-time honours list, including those achieved during the club's semi-professional period.

Domestic

League
 Chinese Jia-A League (top division until 2003)
Runners-up (2): 1992, 1994 

 Chinese Super League (top division since 2004)
Winners (8): 2011, 2012, 2013, 2014, 2015, 2016, 2017, 2019
Runners-up (2): 2018, 2020

 Chinese Second Division / Jia-B League (second division until 2003)
Winners (3): 1956, 1958, 1981
Runners-up (2): 1983, 1990

 China League One (second division since 2004)
Winners (2): 2007, 2010

Cups
 Chinese FA Cup
Winners (2): 2012, 2016
Runners-up (2): 1991, 2013

 Chinese FA Super Cup
Winners (4): 2012, 2016, 2017, 2018
Runners-up (3): 2013, 2014, 2015

International
 AFC Champions League
Winners (2): 2013, 2015

 FIFA Club World Cup
Fourth place (2): 2013, 2015

Results

All-time league rankings

Notes
No league games in 1959, 1966–1972, 1975, and 1976; Guangzhou did not enter the league in 1960, 1973, 1974, 1977, 1978, and 1979.
 No promotion.  In final group stage.  In Changsha Group (first round).  Drawn matches were decided on penalties after 90 minutes.  Relegated for match-fixing scandal. In Group A.  Lost in the CSL championship final.  Not played due to the COVID-19 pandemic.

Key
<div>

 Div = Division
 Pld = Played
 W = Games won
 D = Games drawn
 L = Games lost
 F = Goals for
 A = Goals against
 Pts = Points
 Pos. = Final position

 DNQ = Did not qualify
 DNE = Did not enter
 NH = Not held
 – = Did not exist
 R1 = First round
 R2 = Second round
 R3 = Third round
 R4 = Fourth round
 R5 = Fifth round

 SF = Semi-finals
 QF = Quarter-finals
 R16 = Round of 16
 Group = Group stage

International results

Records and statistics

Past and present internationals
Names in bold indicate players who had international appearances for their countries while playing for Guangzhou.

Angola
 Quinzinho (2003–2004)

Australia
 Brad Maloney (1995)

Belarus
 Mikalay Ryndzyuk (2005)

Brazil
 Paulinho (2015–2017, 2018–2021)
 Ricardo Goulart (2015–2021)
 Robinho (2015)

Cameroon
  Bertin Tomou (2001)

Canada
  Charles Gbeke (2010)

China PR
 A Lan (2015–2021)
 Ai Kesen (2013–2016, 2019–2021)
 Bai Lei (2008–2009)
 Deng Hanwen (2018–2022)
 Dong Xuesheng (2014–2015)
 Feng Renliang (2013–2014)	
 Feng Xiaoting (2011–2020)
 Gao Lin (2010–2019)
 Gao Zhunyi (2019–2022)
 He Chao (2019–2022)
 Hu Zhaojun (2009–2010)
 Hu Zhijun (1990–1997)
 Huang Bowen (2012–2022)
 Huang Hongtao (1990–1996, 1999–2000)
 Huang Qineng (1991–1998)
 Jiang Guangtai (2019–2022)
 Jiang Ning (2011–2012)
 Kong Guoxian (1986–1993, 1998)
 Li Jianhua (2009–2012)	
 Li Wei (2005–2006)
 Li Xuepeng (2014–present)
 Li Yong (1988–1995)
 Liao Lisheng (2013–2022)
 Liu Dianzuo  (2016–2022)

 Liu Jian (2014–2017)
 Liu Yiming (2019–2022)
 Luo Guofu (2020–2021)
 Mai Chao (1981–1995)
 Mei Fang (2014–2022)	
 Peng Weiguo (1990–1997)
 Peng Xinli (2012–2016)
 Qin Sheng (2012–2014)	
 Rong Hao (2012–2020)	
 Rong Zhixing (1966–1969)
 Su Yongshun (1950s)	
 Sun Xiang (2010–2014)
 Wang Jingbin (2015–2020)
 Wei Shihao (2019–present)
 Wu Pingfeng (2008–2012)
 Wu Qunli (1983–1985, 1990–1993)
 Xu Liang (2007–2009)
 Yang Hao (2011)
 Yang Jun (2011–2013)
 Yang Liyu (2018–present)
 Ye Weichao (2011–2014)
 Yu Hanchao (2014–2020)	
 Zeng Cheng (2013–2020)
 Zhang Chenglin (2017–2022)	
 Zhang Jiaqi (2015–2020)
 Zhang Linpeng (2011–2022)
 Zhang Wenzhao (2016–2020)
 Zhang Xiuwei (2019–present)
 Zhao Dayu (1978–1986)
 Zhao Peng (2013–2014)	
 Zhao Xuri (2012–2015)	
 Zheng Long (2013–2019)	
 Zheng Zhi (2010–2022)
 Zou Zheng (2015–2018)

Colombia
 Jackson Martínez (2016–2019)

DR Congo
 Patrick Katalay (2000–2001)

Honduras
 Luis Ramírez (2001, 2007–2009)

Hong Kong
 Ng Wai Chiu (2002–2003)	
 Wei Zhao (2003–2006)

Italy
 Alessandro Diamanti (2014)
 Alberto Gilardino (2014)

Korea Republic
 Cho Won-hee (2011–2012)	
 Kim Hyung-il (2017)	
 Kim Young-gwon (2012–2018)
 Park Ji-ho (1998)
 Park Ji-soo (2019–2022)

Nigeria
 Dominic Iorfa (1997)

Paraguay
 Lucas Barrios (2012–2013)	
 Casiano Delvalle (2007)

Peru
 Ismael Alvarado (2008–2009)

Romania
 Corneliu Papură (2006)	
 Claudiu Răducanu (2006)
 Constantin Schumacher (2006)

Serbia
 Nemanja Gudelj (2018)

Trinidad and Tobago
 Arnold Dwarika (2004)	
 Gary Glasgow (2003–2004)

Uruguay
 Alejandro Javier Larrea (2001)

Notes and references

External links

 Official website 
 Supporters' website 
 Stats on Sina 

 
Chinese Super League clubs
Football clubs in Guangzhou
1954 establishments in China
Association football clubs established in 1954
Companies listed on the National Equities Exchange and Quotations
AFC Champions League winning clubs